Milton Mesirow (November 9, 1899 – August 5, 1972), better known as Mezz Mezzrow, was an American jazz clarinetist and saxophonist from Chicago, Illinois. He is remembered for organizing and financing recording sessions with Tommy Ladnier and Sidney Bechet. He recorded with Bechet as well and briefly acted as manager for Louis Armstrong. Mezzrow is equally known as a colorful character, as portrayed in his autobiography, Really the Blues (which takes its title from a Bechet composition), co-written with Bernard Wolfe and published in 1946.

Music career
According to one biographer: "As a juvenile delinquent, [Mezzrow] was in and out of reformatory schools and prisons where he was exposed to jazz and blues music. He began to play the clarinet and decided to adopt the African American culture as his own. He became a ubiquitous figure on the Chicago jazz scene of the 1920s and ran in the circles of musicians that included King Oliver, Louis Armstrong, Sidney Bechet, Jimmy Noone, Al Jolson, Baby Dodds, Bix Beiderbecke, Louis Bellson and many others. [He] was an advocate for the pure New Orleans jazz style."

Along with other white musicians of his era, such as Eddie Condon and Frank Teschemacher, Mezzrow visited the Sunset Café in Chicago to learn from, and listen to, Louis Armstrong and his Hot Five. He admired Armstrong so much that after the release of "Heebie Jeebies", he, along with Teschemacher, drove 53 miles to Indiana in order to play the song for Bix Beiderbecke.

Mezzrow's first recordings were released in 1933, under the band name Mezz Mezzrow And His Orchestra. The group was composed primarily of black musicians such as Benny Carter, Teddy Wilson, Pops Foster, and Willie "The Lion" Smith, but also included the Jewish trumpet player Max Kaminsky. During the 1930s and 1940s, Mezzrow organized and took part in many recording sessions with Sidney Bechet. These recordings, by the Mezzrow-Bechet Quintet and Mezzrow-Bechet Septet, featured black musicians such as Frankie Newton, Sammy Price, Tommy Ladnier, Sidney Catlett, and Pleasant Joe, plus Art Hodes, who was born in the Ukraine. Mezzrow's 1938 sessions for the French jazz critic Hugues Panassié involved Bechet and Ladnier, and helped spark the "New Orleans revival". He also played on six recordings by Fats Waller in 1934.

In the mid-1940s, Mezzrow started his own record label, King Jazz Records, featuring himself with groups, usually including Sidney Bechet and often including the trumpeter Oran "Hot Lips" Page.

He appeared at the 1948 Nice Jazz Festival, following which he made his home in France and organized many bands that included French musicians including Claude Luter and visiting Americans, such as Buck Clayton, Peanuts Holland, Jimmy Archey, Kansas Fields and Lionel Hampton.  With ex-Count Basie trumpeter Buck Clayton, he made a recording of Louis Armstrong's "West End Blues" in Paris in 1953.

His total recorded output amounts to almost 150 sides, all of which were also collected and re-released on various albums. Despite this lengthy and successful career, the record producer Al Rose was critical of Mezzrow's musicianship, saying that in his opinion "he wasn't a very good clarinetist," while praising him for his willingness to help other musicians in need and citing "his generosity and his total devotion to the music we call jazz."

Personal life

Milton Mesirow was ethnically and religiously Jewish, and was raised in Chicago. His wife, Johnnie Mae, was a black Baptist. They had one son, Milton Mesirow, Jr. According to the younger Mesirow, the surname "Mezzrow" was a "pen name" of his father's. In an interview with The New York Times in 2015, "Mezz Jr.", as he was known, told a reporter: "My father put me in a shul, and my mother's side tried to make me a Baptist. So when I'm asked what my religion is, I just say 'jazz.'"

Mezzrow praised and admired African-American culture and style. In his autobiography, Really the Blues, he wrote that from the moment he heard jazz he "was going to be a Negro musician, hipping [telling] the world about the blues the way only Negroes can." Eddie Condon said of him (in We Called It Music, London; Peter Davis 1948): "When he fell through the Mason–Dixon line he just kept going".

The family lived in Harlem, New York City, where Mezzrow declared himself a "voluntary Negro" and was listed as Negro on his draft card in World War II.  He believed that "he had definitely 'crossed the line' that divided white and black identities".

Mezzrow became known as much for his cannabis advocacy as his music. In his time, he was so well known in the jazz community for selling marijuana that  became slang for marijuana, a reference used in the Stuff Smith song, "If You're a Viper". He was also known as the Muggles King, the word muggles being slang for marijuana at that time; the title of the 1928 Louis Armstrong recording "Muggles" refers to this. Armstrong was one of his biggest customers. A letter from 1932, written by Armstrong, demonstrates this relationship; while in England, Armstrong detailed in this letter about where and how Mezzrow should send marijuana.

In 1940, he was arrested in possession of sixty joints while trying to enter a jazz club at the 1939 New York World's Fair, with intent to distribute. When he was sent to jail, he insisted to the guards that he was black and was transferred to the segregated prison's black section. In Really the Blues, he wrote:

Mezzrow was lifelong friends with the French jazz critic Hugues Panassié and spent the last 20 years of his life in France. He was preceded in death by his wife, Johnnie Mae Mezzrow, and was buried in the Père Lachaise Cemetery in Paris. The couple were survived by their son Mezz Jr.

In 2015, a Greenwich Village jazz club called Mezzrow was named in his honor.

Selected discography
1947: Really the Blues, Jazz Archives (France)		
1951: Mezz Mezzrow & His Band Featuring Collins & Singleton, Blue Note		
1954: Mezz Mezzrow1954: Mezz Mezzrow with Frankie Newton, Victor Records		
1954: Mezz Mezzrow's Swing Session, X Records		
1954: Mezzin' Around, RCA		
1955: Mezz Mezzrow, Disques Swing		
1955: Paris 1955, Vol. 1, Disques Swing			
1955: Mezz Mezzrow in Paris, 1955, Jazz Time Records		
1956: Mezz Mezzrow a La Schola Cantorum, Ducretet-Thomson Records			
1995: Makin' Friends, EPM		
2007: Tells the King Jazz Story, Crisler		
2012: Mezzrow and Bechet Remastered'', Gralin Music

References

1899 births
1972 deaths
Dixieland clarinetists
Dixieland saxophonists
American jazz clarinetists
American jazz saxophonists
American male saxophonists
Jewish American musicians
Blue Note Records artists
American people convicted of drug offenses
American cannabis activists
American cannabis traffickers
Cannabis in New York (state)
Jewish jazz musicians
20th-century American saxophonists
20th-century American male musicians
American male jazz musicians
20th-century American Jews